Manikganj-3 is a constituency represented in the Jatiya Sangsad (National Parliament) of Bangladesh since 2008 by Zahid Maleque of the Awami League.

Boundaries 
The constituency encompasses Saturia Upazila and all but the three southernmost union parishads of Manikganj Sadar Upazila: Bhararia, Hati Para, and Putail.

History 
The constituency was created in 1984 from the Dhaka-3 constituency when the former Dhaka District was split into six districts: Manikganj, Munshiganj, Dhaka, Gazipur, Narsingdi, and Narayanganj.

Ahead of the 2008 general election, the Election Commission redrew constituency boundaries to reflect population changes revealed by the 2001 Bangladesh census. The 2008 redistricting  altered the boundaries of the constituency.

Members of Parliament

Elections

Elections in the 2010s 
Zahid Maleque was re-elected unopposed in the 2014 general election after opposition parties withdrew their candidacies in a boycott of the election.

Elections in the 2000s

Elections in the 1990s 
Nizam Uddin Khan died in office. Abdul Wahab Khan of the BNP was elected in a 1996 by-election.

References

External links
 

Parliamentary constituencies in Bangladesh
Manikganj District